W. E. Daniel was an American football coach.  He served as head football coach at McPherson College in McPherson, Kansas, serving for one season, in 1920, and compiling a record of 5–3–3.

References

Year of birth missing
Year of death missing
McPherson Bulldogs football coaches